Loïc Jouannigot (born 1953 in Brittany, France) is a children's book illustrator. A graduate of the École des Beaux-Arts, he has worked for the children's book and advertising industries. His work has appeared in the Beechwood Bunny Tales (La Famille Passiflore) series by Geneviève Huriet, as well as Claude Clément's Les Pataclous.

Jouannigot was a silent partner with another French-born illustrator, Michel Plessix, in recent artwork for Kenneth Grahame's The Wind in the Willows.

References

External links
 Loïc Jouannigot at Éditions Milan
 Some of Jouannigot's work for the Beechwood books
 A list of titles illustrated by Jouannigot

1953 births
French children's book illustrators
French illustrators
Living people